Paopi 3 - Coptic Calendar - Paopi 5

The fourth day of the Coptic month of Paopi, the second month of the Coptic year. On a common year, this day corresponds to October 1, of the Julian Calendar, and October 14, of the Gregorian Calendar. This day falls in the Coptic season of Akhet, the season of inundation.

Commemorations 

 The martyrdom of Saint Bacchus, the close friend of Saint Sergius

References 

Days of the Coptic calendar